Abraham Rosenthal is the name of:

A. M. Rosenthal, Canadian journalist
Abe Rosenthal, British former soccer player